Nørre Aaby is a town in central Denmark, located in Middelfart Municipality on the island of Funen. Until Kommunalreformen ("The Municipality Reform" of 2007) it was the site of the municipal council of the now former Nørre Aaby Municipality. 

The town is most known for the great number of efterskoler located around the town: Viby Efterskole, Båring Efterskole, Vesterdal Efterskole, Nørre Åby Efterskole and Eisbjerghus Efterskole.

The population of Nørre Aaby is 3,133 (1 January 2022).

Notable people 
 Jørgen Aabye (1868 in Nørre Aaby – 1959) a Danish painter of religious art, portraits and landscapes
 Søren Absalon Larsen (1871 in Nørre Aaby – 1957) a Danish physicist who worked on electroacoustics gave his name to the Larsen effect

External links
Nørre Aaby municipality

References

Cities and towns in the Region of Southern Denmark
Populated places in Funen
Middelfart Municipality